Monika Staab (born 9 January 1959) is a former German football player and currently the technical director of Saudi Arabia. From 2012 until 2014 she was 15 months in charge of Qatar women's national football team. She was the manager of the women’s Bundesliga side 1. FFC Frankfurt from 1993 to 2004. She was also the chairman of the club.

She won the UEFA Women's Cup in 2002, the German championship in 1999, 2001, 2002 and 2003 and the German cup in 1999, 2000, 2001, 2002 and 2003.

As a player, she represented the senior team of SG Rosenhöhe Offenbach already at the age of 11, furthermore Kickers Offenbach and NSG Oberst Schiel in Germany and played for clubs abroad such as Paris Saint-Germain and Queens Park Rangers.

In August 2021, she was appointed as the coach of Saudi Arabia's women's national team. As of February 2023, Monika will serve as a technical director of the Women’s Department.

References

External links 

 Player profile at soccerdonna.de
 Manager profile at soccerdonna.de

1959 births
Living people
German women's footballers
German women's football managers
1. FFC Frankfurt
Paris Saint-Germain Féminine players
Expatriate women's footballers in England
Expatriate women's footballers in France
Women's association football midfielders
Southampton Women's F.C. players
German expatriate sportspeople in England
Saudi Arabia women's national football team managers
German expatriate sportspeople in France
German expatriate women's footballers
Expatriate football managers in Bahrain
Expatriate football managers in Qatar
Expatriate football managers in Saudi Arabia
German expatriate sportspeople in Bahrain
German expatriate sportspeople in Qatar
German expatriate sportspeople in Saudi Arabia